New Aomori Prefecture General Sports Park is a group of sports facilities in Aomori, Aomori, Japan.

Kakuhiro Group Athletic Stadium,  is an athletic stadium in Aomori, Aomori, Japan. The facilities is the home venue for the ReinMeer Aomori, a Japan Football League team.

The Maeda Arena is an indoor arena in Aomori, Japan.  The arena used mainly for indoor sports.  The facility has a capacity of 5,500 people and was opened in 2002.  It hosted the figure skating as well as the opening and closing ceremonies for the 2003 Winter Asian Games. It is a part of New Aomori Prefectural General Sports Park.

References

External links
 Website
 New Aomori Prefecture Sports Park

Aomori Wat's
Athletics (track and field) venues in Japan
Basketball venues in Japan
Football venues in Japan
Indoor arenas in Japan
ReinMeer Aomori
Sports venues in Aomori (city)
Sports venues completed in 2002
2002 establishments in Japan